Barry Rugby Football Club is a Welsh rugby union club based in Barry in Vale of Glamorgan, Wales.

Club honours
WRU Division Five South East 2009/10 - Champions

Notable former players
  Geoff Beckingham
  Barry Davies
  Dai Evans
  Haydn Morris

References

Welsh rugby union teams
Sport in the Vale of Glamorgan